The 2022 J Awards are the 18th annual J Awards, established by the Australian Broadcasting Corporation's youth-focused radio station Triple J.

The eligibility period for releases took place between November 2021 and October 2022. The nominations were announced on 1 November 2022 and winners were announced on 17 November 2022.

Awards

Australian Album of the Year
The nominees for albums, chosen for their creativity, musicianship and contribution to Australian music.

Double J Artist of the Year
The artists who impressed Double J with their musical excellence and contribution to Australian music.

Australian Video of the Year
This award celebrates creativity, originality and technical excellence in music videos.

Unearthed Artist of the Year
Five artists that have risen through the ranks of Unearthed and are set for massive things in 2023.

Done Good Award
The Done Good Award recognises an individual, group or business in the Australian music scene who has gone above-and-beyond and done something real good this year.

References

2022 in Australian music
2022 music awards
J Awards